Richard Trenton Chase (May 23, 1950 – December 26, 1980) was an American serial killer, cannibal, and necrophile who killed six people in the span of a month in 1977 and 1978 in Sacramento, California. He was nicknamed The Vampire of Sacramento because he drank his victims' blood and cannibalized their remains.

Early life 
Chase was a native of Sacramento, California. By the age of 5, he exhibited evidence of all three parts of the Macdonald triad, a theory suggesting the development of violent psychopathy. In his adolescence, he was said to be a heavy drug user.

Early adulthood 
Chase developed hypochondria as he matured. He often complained that his heart would occasionally "stop beating", or that "someone had stolen his pulmonary artery". He would hold oranges on his head, believing Vitamin C would be absorbed by his brain via diffusion. Chase also believed that his cranial bones had become separated and were moving around, so he shaved his head to be able to watch this activity.

After leaving his mother's house (believing she was attempting to poison him), Chase rented an apartment with friends. Chase's roommates complained that he was constantly under the influence of alcohol, marijuana, and LSD. Chase would also walk around the apartment nude, even in front of company. Chase's roommates demanded that he move out. When he refused, the roommates moved out instead.

Once alone in the apartment, Chase began to capture, kill, and disembowel various animals, which he would then devour raw, sometimes mixing the raw organs with Coca-Cola in a blender and drinking the concoction. Chase believed that by ingesting the creatures he was preventing his heart from shrinking.

Institutionalization 
Chase spent a brief time in a psychiatric ward in 1973. In 1976, he was involuntarily committed to a mental institution when he was taken to a hospital after injecting rabbit's blood into his veins. The staff nicknamed him "Dracula" because of his blood fixation. He broke the necks of two birds he caught through the institution window and drank their blood. He also extracted blood from therapy dogs with stolen syringes.

Chase was diagnosed with paranoid schizophrenia. After undergoing a battery of treatments involving psychotropic drugs, Chase was deemed no longer a danger to society, and later in 1976, he was released to his mother's custody.

Chase's mother weaned him off his medication and got him his own apartment. He initially shared the apartment with roommates before all of them moved out, leaving Chase on his own.

Later investigation uncovered that, in mid-1977, Chase was stopped and arrested on a reservation in the Pyramid Lake, Nevada, area. His body was smeared with blood and a bucket of blood was found in his truck. The blood was determined to be cow's blood, and no charges were filed.

Murder spree 
On December 29, 1977, Chase killed his first known victim in a drive-by shooting. The victim, Ambrose Griffin, was a 51-year-old engineer and father of two.

Two weeks later, he attempted to enter the home of a woman, but because her doors were locked, he walked away. Chase later told detectives that he took locked doors as a sign that he was not welcome, but unlocked doors were an invitation to come inside. On one occasion, he was caught and chased off by a couple returning home as he pilfered their belongings; he had also urinated and defecated on their infant child's bed and clothing.

On January 23, 1978, Chase broke into a house and shot Teresa Wallin (three months pregnant at the time) three times. He then had sexual intercourse with her corpse while stabbing her with a butcher's knife. He then removed multiple organs, cut off one of her nipples and drank her blood. He stuffed dog feces from Wallin's yard down her throat before leaving.

On January 27, Chase entered the home of 38-year-old Evelyn Miroth. He encountered her friend, Danny Meredith, whom he shot with his .22 handgun. He then fatally shot Miroth, her six-year-old son Jason, and her 22-month-old nephew David Ferreira, before mutilating Miroth and engaging in necrophilia and cannibalism with her corpse. A visitor's knock on the door startled Chase, who fled in Meredith's car, taking Ferreira's body with him. The visitor alerted a neighbor, who called police. They discovered that Chase had left complete handprints and shoe imprints in Miroth's blood. Chase was arrested shortly afterwards; police who searched Chase's apartment found that the walls, floor, ceiling, refrigerator, and all of Chase's eating and drinking utensils were soaked in blood.

Aftermath 

In 1979, Chase stood trial on six counts of murder. In order to avoid the death penalty, the defense tried to have him found guilty of second degree murder, which would result in a life sentence. Their case hinged on Chase's history of mental illness and the suggestion that his crimes were not premeditated.

On May 8, 1979, the jury found Chase guilty of six counts of first degree murder and, rejecting the argument that he was not guilty by reason of insanity, sentenced him to die in the gas chamber. His fellow inmates, aware of the extremely violent and grisly nature of Chase's crimes, feared him and, according to prison officials, often tried to persuade Chase to commit suicide.

Chase granted a series of interviews with Robert K. Ressler, during which he spoke of his fears of Nazis and UFOs, claiming that although he had killed, it was not his fault; he had been forced to kill to keep himself alive, which he believed any person would do. He asked Ressler to give him access to a radar gun, with which he could apprehend the Nazi UFOs, so that the Nazis could stand trial for the murders. He also handed Ressler a large amount of macaroni and cheese, which he had been hoarding in his pants pockets, believing that the prison officials were in league with the Nazis and attempting to kill him with poisoned food.

On December 26, 1980, Chase was found dead in his prison cell. An autopsy revealed that he had committed suicide with an overdose of prescribed medications.

In popular culture 

 In 1987, the film Rampage was made which was based on Chase's crimes. 
 Investigation Discovery's 2011 TV special, Lore: Deadly Obsession, was a two-hour documentary reenactment of Chase's crimes.
 The 2009 Church of Misery song, "Blood Sucking Freak (Richard Trenton Chase)," is about Richard Chase.
 The 2010 Xiu Xiu song "House Sparrow" is about Richard Chase.

See also 
 List of serial killers in the United States

References

Cited works and further reading

External links 
Richard Chase at the Crime Library

1950 births
1977 murders in the United States
1980 suicides
20th-century American criminals
American cannibals
American male criminals
American mass murderers
American murderers of children
American people convicted of murder
American people who died in prison custody
American prisoners sentenced to death
American serial killers
Criminals from California
Drug-related suicides in California
Hypochondriacs
Male serial killers
Necrophiles
Place of death missing
People convicted of murder by California
People from Sacramento, California
People with schizophrenia
Prisoners sentenced to death by California
Prisoners who died in California detention
Serial killers who committed suicide in prison custody
Vampirism (crime)